Egon Johann Franke (23 October 1935 – 30 March 2022) was a Polish fencer and Olympic champion in foil competition. He won a gold medal in the individual foil at the 1964 Summer Olympics in Tokyo. He also received a team silver medal in 1964 and a bronze medal in 1968.

References

External links
 

1935 births
2022 deaths
Polish male fencers
Olympic fencers of Poland
Fencers at the 1960 Summer Olympics
Fencers at the 1964 Summer Olympics
Fencers at the 1968 Summer Olympics
Olympic gold medalists for Poland
Olympic silver medalists for Poland
Olympic bronze medalists for Poland
Sportspeople from Gliwice
Olympic medalists in fencing
Medalists at the 1964 Summer Olympics
Medalists at the 1968 Summer Olympics
Polish people of German descent
20th-century Polish people
21st-century Polish people